Gaidukov (masculine) or Gaidukova (feminine) is a Russian surname. Notable people with the surname include:

Aleksandr Gaidukov (born 1979), Russian footballer
Aleksandr Gaidukov (water polo), Russian water polo player
Maksim Gaidukov (born 1995), Russian footballer

Russian-language surnames